The Harrier is a medium-sized  dog breed of the  hound class, 
used for hunting hares by trailing them. It resembles an English Foxhound but is slightly smaller, though not as small as a Beagle. The breed has been used since the mid 13th century.

Description

Appearance
The Harrier is similar to the English Foxhound, but smaller. Harriers stand between 19 and 21 inches at the shoulder, and adults weigh between 45 and 65 lbs. They do shed, have short hair and hanging ears, and come in a variety of color patterns. A humorous description of a Harrier is that of "a Beagle on steroids",  despite its resemblance to an English Foxhound.  It is a muscular hunting hound with a small, hard coat. It has large bones for stamina and strength.  The Harrier is slightly longer than tall, with a level topline. The tail is medium-length, carried high, but is not curled over the back. The skull is broad with a strong square muzzle. The rounded ears are pendant, and the eyes are either brown or hazel. The wide nose is black. The expression is mellow when the dog is relaxed and alert when he is excited. The teeth should meet in a scissors or level bite. The feet are tight and cat-like, and the front toes may turn inward.

Temperament
The Harrier is  cheerful, sweet-tempered,  tolerant of people, and it is excellent with children. This pack dog is good with other dogs, but should be supervised with non-canine pets unless it is raised with them from puppyhood. It prefers life in a pack with people, dogs, or both. This active dog likes to go exploring, sniffing, and trailing, so be sure to keep it on a leash or in a safe enclosed area. Some Harriers like to bay.

Health
This breed's lifespan is generally 12–15 years. Hip dysplasia is known to occur in this breed.

Care
The coat needs only occasional brushing to remove dead hair.

Exercise
The Harrier requires daily exercise, such as long vigorous walks or runs. Without appropriate exercise, the Harrier can become hyperactive, overweight and/or destructive. While this dog was bred to run and work all day long and cannot be satisfied by a completely sedentary lifestyle, they adapt very well to the average home.

History
Sources have widely conflicting stories about the origins of this breed. According to one, the earliest Harrier types were crossed with Bloodhounds, the Talbot Hound, and even the Basset Hound. According to another, the breed was probably developed from crosses of the English Foxhound with Fox Terrier and Greyhound. Yet another regards the Harrier as simply a bred-down version of the English Foxhound. Although there are many working Harriers in England, the breed is still not recognised in that country.

In any case, today's Harrier is between the Beagle and English Foxhound in size and was developed primarily to hunt hares, though the breed has also been used in fox hunting. The name, "Harrier", reveals the breed's specialty - compare "harehound". The Harrier has a long history of popularity as a working pack-dog in England.

The Harrier is the most commonly used hound by hunts in Ireland, with 166 harrier packs, 37 of them mounted packs and 129 of them foot packs, spread throughout the country. In Ireland it is used to hunt both foxes and hares, with some packs hunting mainly foxes.

This breed of dog is recognized in 1885 by the American Kennel Club and is classified in the Hound Group.

The Harrier Club of America cites the earliest description of a Harrier in "The Chace" (by the English poet William Somervile) which was written in 1735.

See also
 Dogs portal
 List of dog breeds
 Hunting with Harriers

References

External links

 

Dog breeds originating in the United Kingdom
FCI breeds
Rare dog breeds
Scent hounds